Tetramethoxymethane is a chemical compound which is formally formed by complete methylation of the hypothetical orthocarbonic acid C(OH)4 (orthocarboxylic acid violates the Erlenmeyer rule and is unstable in free state).

Preparation 
The obvious synthetic route from tetrachloromethane does not yield the desired product. The original preparation of the tetramethoxymethane was therefore based on chloropicrin:

Because of the unpleasant properties of the chloropicrin, other tetrasubstituted reactive methane derivatives were investigated as starting material for tetramethoxymethane. For example, trichloromethanesulfenyl chloride (also used as a chemical warfare agent and easily accessible from carbon bisulfide and chlorine) was used:

A less problematic synthesis is based on trichloroacetonitrile, with yields of about 70% be achieved:

Further preparative methods are described in the literature.

Properties 
Tetramethoxymethane is water-clear, aromatic-smelling, low-viscosity liquid which is stable against peroxide formation.

Use 
In addition to the use as a solvent, tetramethoxymethane is used as a fuel in polymer fuel cells, as an alkylating agent at elevated temperatures (180-200 °C) as a transesterification reagent (but showing less reactivity than trimethoxymethane) and as a reagent for the synthesis of 2-aminobenzoxazoles, which are used as molecular building blocks in pharmaceutical active ingredients used in neuroleptics, sedatives, antiemetics, muscle relaxants, fungicides and others.

Depending on the substituents, the one pot reaction proceeds in "modest to excellent" yields.

References 

Carbonate esters
Orthoesters
Methyl esters